Joseph Azar is the name of:

Joseph Azar (prince) ( 14th century), prominent Jewish merchant chief on the Malabar Coast, India
Joseph Azar (singer) (born 1942), Lebanese artist and singer